Group B of EuroBasket 2022 consisted of Bosnia and Herzegovina, France, Germany, Hungary, Lithuania, and Slovenia. The games were played from 1 to 7 September 2022 at the Lanxess Arena in Cologne, Germany. The top four teams advanced to the knockout stage.

Teams

Notes

Standings

Matches
All times are local (UTC+2).

Bosnia and Herzegovina vs Hungary

Slovenia vs Lithuania

France vs Germany

Germany vs Bosnia and Herzegovina

Lithuania vs France

Hungary vs Slovenia

Lithuania vs Germany
During the match, Lithuanian star basketballer Valančiūnas drew Maodo Lo's foul and was rewarded with 2 free throws. Seconds later, Germany's head coach Gordon Herbert received a technical foul. According to FIBA rules, the free throw for the technical foul is supposed to be attempted before the two shots for the shooting foul. However, only the two free throws for the regular foul were taken, failing to award Lithuania with additional throw. As a result, Lithuania registered an official complaint with FIBA. On 8 September 2022, FIBA recognized the error of the referees in the match between Lithuania and Germany. The three referees of the Lithuania-Germany game was suspended by FIBA and will not participate in any other game this EuroBasket.

Slovenia vs Bosnia and Herzegovina

France vs Hungary

Bosnia and Herzegovina vs France

Hungary vs Lithuania

Germany vs Slovenia

Lithuania vs Bosnia and Herzegovina

France vs Slovenia

Hungary vs Germany

References

External links
Official website

Group B